Dr. Chenchu Garataiah Bachina (born 1 March 1948) is an Indian Politician of Yuvajana Sramika Rythu Congress Party which is renowned as YSR Congress Party. He was a member of Telugu Desam Party (TDP)  until 2009.

Personal life
Dr. Chenchu Garataiah Bachina was born and brought up in Panguluru Mandal of Prakasam District of Andhra Pradesh. His father's name is Bachina Veera Raghavaiah, his mother's name is Lakshmi Kanthamma and his spouse's name is Ratna Kumari. He has total of three children. He pursued SSC, PUC and acquired M.B.B.S. Degree from Jawaharlal Nehru Medical College, Belgaum, Karnataka in the year 1972. Dr. Bachina Chenchu Garataiah worked as a house surgeon In Gandhi Medical College, Secunderabad during 1972 to 1973 and in 1974 he worked as a house surgeon  in Ongole.

Political career
In 1973, while he worked as a house surgeon, he learned of the problems faced by the farmers in his native village Panguluru. Then he familiarised himself with the problems faced by farmers. He noticed that there was a scam which is going on in the societies in Panguluru. Then Dr. Chenchu Garataiah Bachina started agitation against that society and with his friends and some youth in his village. He gathered and formed a team and started working to form a society to provide quality seeds to the farmers. In the process, he interacted with Andhra Agitation – AndhraSena leaders like Madala, Janaki Rao, Battina, Subbarao, Challa, Subbarao and Basivi Reddy. Finally, he formed a Co-operative Society for Panguluru with 200 members with an amount of Rs.20, 000/-.

From 1974 onwards, he started to focus on problems faced by people in society. He observed mainly some problems like transportation problems like "No Electricity, No Communication and No Proper Facilities for Irrigation." In order to overcome these problems, he entered politics.

References

External links
 Official website

Living people
People from Prakasam district
People from Andhra Pradesh
Indian National Congress politicians
YSR Congress Party politicians
1948 births